Hemayat Mirzadeh (born in 1962) is an Iranian politician and academic. He was born in Germi, Ardabil province. He is a member of the tenth Islamic Consultative Assembly from the electorate of Germi.

References

Living people
1962 births
Deputies of Germi
People from Germi
Members of the 10th Islamic Consultative Assembly
Iranian reformists
Academic staff of the Islamic Azad University